The Pacific Seacraft 40 is a bluewater cruising yacht produced since 1996 by Pacific Seacraft of Washington, North Carolina. Although of GRP construction, the yacht is traditionally built with a cutter rig, skeg-hung rudder, canoe stern and semi-long keel. The yacht is a cruising design, with a high displacement and the characteristic 'canoe' stern of Bill Crealock.

See also
Pacific Seacraft 37
Pacific Seacraft 44

External links
Pacific Seacraft
The Pacific Seacraft 40
data and overview on sailboat.guide

Sailing yachts
Boats designed by W. I. B. Crealock
1990s sailboat type designs
Sailboat types built by Pacific Seacraft